This is a survey of the postage stamps and postal history of Hawaii.

The Hawaiian Islands occupy most of an archipelago in the central Pacific Ocean, southwest of the continental United States. It was governed by the Kingdom of Hawaii until 1893, Provisional Government of Hawaii through 1894, and Republic of Hawaii until 1898. It became the Territory of Hawaii in 1898 and then US State of Hawaii in 1959.

First stamps
The first stamps of Hawaii were the Hawaiian Missionaries issued in 1851 by Henry Martyn Whitney (son of missionaries).

Later issues
Beginning in 1853, the government of Hawaii began issuing stamps engraved with the busts of members of the royal family of the Kingdom of Hawaii.

Provisional government

Following the overthrow of the Kingdom of Hawaii in 1893, the Provisional Government overprinted existing stamps.

Republican government
The Republic of Hawaii was established on July 4, 1894, and the republican government issued a set of stamps in 1894.

Final issues
The last stamps for Hawaii were issued in 1899 after the Territory of Hawaii had been established.

See also 
 Hawaiian Missionaries
 Hawaiian Philatelic Society
 Revenue stamps of Hawaii
 Ryohei Ishikawa

References

Further reading 
 Henry A. Meyer. Hawaii, its stamp and postal history. New York: Philatelic Foundation, 1948.

External links
Hawaiian Philatelic Society

Communications in Hawaii
Hawaii
Philately of the United States